William Byron, 3rd Baron Byron (1636 – 13 November 1695) was an English nobleman, peer, politician, and a poet.

Life
Byron was the son of Richard Byron, 2nd Baron Byron and Elizabeth Rossell. He succeeded to the title of 3rd Baron Byron in 1679 upon the death of his father.

Lord Byron died on 13 November 1695, and was succeeded by his fifth (but only surviving) son William Byron, 4th Baron Byron (born 1669/70).

Family
Lord Byron married the Hon. Elizabeth Chaworth, daughter of John Chaworth, 2nd Viscount Chaworth of Armagh and Hon. Elizabeth Noel, in 1660. They had five sons, but the first four died in infancy:
 Hon. William Byron (born before 1670)
 Hon. Richard Byron (born before 1670)
 Hon. John Byron (born before 1670)
 Hon. Ernestus Byron (born before 1670)
 William Byron, 4th Baron Byron (1669/70–1736)

Lord Byron married Elizabeth Stonhouse, daughter of Sir George Stonhouse, 3rd Bt. and Margaret Lovelace, on 25 June 1685.

A daughter (from which of the two marriages is unclear), Hon. Catherine Byron, died in 1746. She married Arthur Cole, 1st  Baron Ranelagh; they had no children.

References
William Byron, 3rd Baron Byron, at thepeerage.com (accessed 26 November 2009)

1636 births
1695 deaths
William
17th-century English nobility
Barons Byron